Kolyai District is a district (bakhsh) in Sonqor County, Kermanshah Province, Iran. At the 2006 census, its population was 15,600, in 3,828 families.  The District has one city: Satar.  The District has Three rural districts (dehestan): Agahan Rural District, Kivananat Rural District, and Satar Rural District.

References 

Sonqor County
Districts of Kermanshah Province